Carl Emil Moltke (9 January 1773 – 19 March 1858) was a Danish diplomat and landowner. He owned Aagaard from 1804 and Nørager from 1837.

Early life and education
Moltke was born at Bregentved, the son of Adam Gottlob Moltke (1710–92) and Sophie Hedevig Raben (1733–1802). He was the brother of Otto Joachim Moltke and Gebhard Moltke-Hvitfeldt and the half-brother of   Adam Gottlob Ferdinand Moltke, Caspar Moltke, Joachim Godske Moltke and Ludvig Moltke (1745–1824).

Career as naval officer
He entered the Naval Cadet Academy in 1786 and was created second lieutenant in 1789. In 1791–92, he served under Captain Poul de Løvenørn on an expedition to Morocco. In 1793, he entered British service as part of his training. In 1797, he was created first lieutenant. He was dispatched from the Navy in 1803.

Diplomatic career
Moltke began his diplomatic career in 1793 as secretary at the Danish legation in Lisbon. In 1801, he transferred to Madrid where he for a while served as chargé d'affaires. In 1804, he was appointed as Danish envoy in Stockholm but not accredited as such until three years later. He had to leave Stockholm the following year as a result of the war. He was in 1808 appointed as envoy in The Hague but did not fully assume the office until in 1815. In the intermediate years, he was used for various diplomatic missions, for instance in 1813 to the Russian headquarters in Silesia where he was to request Alexander I's mediation in the conflict with England. After five years in the Hague, Moltke was transferred to London. He discontinued his diplomatic career in 1822.

Honours and public offices
Moltke was appointed as chamberlain in 1804 and as Gehejmekonferensråd in 1820. He was a member of Roskilde Provincial Assembly in 1835–46 and was in 1840 appointed as ordenssekretær.

Personal life
Moltke married Asta Thusnelda Münster-Meinhövel (1788–1842), a daughter of Georg Werner August Dietrich Münster-Meinhövel (1751–1801) and Isabella Johanne Charlotte Ompteda (Amalie Münster) (1767–1814), on 5 July 1807 in the Farrison Church in Copenhagen. She bore him one son, Ernst Moltke ( 2 January 1822 – March 1896).

Moltke purchased Aagaard in 1804. He settled on the estate when he discontinued his diplomatic career in 1822. He purchased Nørager in 1837 and spent most of his last years on the estate. He died on 19 March 1858.

References

External links

 Xarl Emil Moltke

19th-century Danish naval officers
Royal Danish Naval Academy alumni
Danish counts
19th-century Danish diplomats
19th-century Danish landowners
People from Faxe Municipality
Moltke family
1773 births
1858 deaths